Several airports are referred to as City Airport & Heliport:

 City Airport Manchester
 Sheffield City Airport (closed)

See also

 City Airport (disambiguation)